Glucose-6-phosphate dehydrogenase deficiency (G6PDD), which is the most common enzyme deficiency worldwide, is an inborn error of metabolism that predisposes to red blood cell breakdown. Most of the time, those who are affected have no symptoms. Following a specific trigger, symptoms such as yellowish skin, dark urine, shortness of breath, and feeling tired may develop. Complications can include anemia and newborn jaundice. Some people never have symptoms.

It is an X-linked recessive disorder that results in defective glucose-6-phosphate dehydrogenase enzyme. Glucose-6-phosphate dehydrogenase is an enzyme which protects red blood cells, which carry oxygen from the lungs to tissues throughout the body. A defect of the enzyme results in the premature breakdown of red blood cells. This destruction of red blood cells is called hemolysis. Red blood cell breakdown may be triggered by infections, certain medication, stress, or foods such as fava beans. Depending on the specific mutation the severity of the condition may vary. Diagnosis is based on symptoms and supported by blood tests and genetic testing.

Affected persons must avoid dietary triggers, notably fava beans. This can be difficult, as fava beans may be called "broad beans" and are used in many foods, whole or as flour. Falafel is probably the best known, but fava beans are also often used as filler in meatballs and other foods. Since G6PD deficiency is not an allergy, food regulations in most countries do not require that fava beans be highlighted as an allergen on the label.

Treatment of acute episodes may include medications for infection, stopping the offending medication, or blood transfusions. Jaundice in newborns may be treated with bili lights. It is recommended that people be tested for G6PDD before certain medications, such as primaquine, are taken.

About 400 million people have the condition globally. It is particularly common in certain parts of Africa, Asia, the Mediterranean, and the Middle East. Males are affected more often than females. In 2015 it is believed to have resulted in 33,000 deaths.

Signs and symptoms
Most individuals with G6PD deficiency are asymptomatic.

Most people who develop symptoms are male, due to the X-linked pattern of inheritance, but female carriers can be affected due to unfavorable lyonization or skewed X-inactivation, where random inactivation of an X-chromosome in certain cells creates a population of G6PD-deficient red blood cells coexisting with unaffected red blood cells. A female with one affected X chromosome will show the deficiency in approximately half of her red blood cells. However, in some cases, including double X-deficiency, the ratio can be much more than half, making the individual almost as sensitive as males.

Red blood cell breakdown (also known as hemolysis) in G6PD deficiency can manifest in a number of ways, including the following:
 Prolonged neonatal jaundice, possibly leading to kernicterus (arguably the most serious complication of G6PD deficiency)
 Hemolytic crises in response to:
 Illness (especially infections)
 Certain drugs (see below)
 Certain foods, most notably broad beans, from which the word favism derives
 Certain chemicals
 Diabetic ketoacidosis
 Hemoglobinuria (red or brown urine)
 Very severe crisis can cause acute kidney injury

Favism is a hemolytic response to the consumption of fava beans, also known as broad beans. Though all individuals with favism show G6PD deficiency, not all individuals with G6PD deficiency show favism. The condition is known to be more prevalent in infants and children, and G6PD genetic variant can influence chemical sensitivity. Other than this, the specifics of the chemical relationship between favism and G6PD are not well understood.

Cause
G6PD deficiency results from mutations in the G6PD gene. G6PD gene contributes to the production of glucose-6-phosphate dehydrogenase. Chemical reactions involving glucose-6-phosphate dehydrogenase produce compounds that prevent reactive oxygen species from building up to toxic levels within red blood cells. If reduction in the amount of glucose-6-phosphate dehydrogenase or alteration of structure occurs due to the mutations of G6PD gene, the enzyme loses it protective role and leads to the accumulation of reactive oxygen species and thus damage of red blood cells.

Triggers
Carriers of the underlying mutation do not show any symptoms unless their red blood cells are exposed to certain triggers, which can be of four main types:
 Foods (fava beans is the hallmark trigger for G6PD mutation carriers),
 Certain medicines including aspirin, quinine and other antimalarials derived from quinine.
 Moth balls (naphthalene)
 Stress from a bacterial or viral infection.

Drugs
Many substances are potentially harmful to people with G6PD deficiency. Variation in response to these substances makes individual predictions difficult. Antimalarial drugs that can cause acute hemolysis in people with G6PD deficiency include primaquine, pamaquine, chloroquine, and hydroxychloroquine. There is evidence that other antimalarials may also exacerbate G6PD deficiency, but only at higher doses. Sulfonamides (such as sulfanilamide, sulfamethoxazole, and mafenide), thiazolesulfone, methylene blue, and naphthalene should also be avoided by people with G6PD deficiency as they antagonize folate synthesis, as should certain analgesics (such as phenazopyridine and acetanilide) and a few non-sulfa antibiotics (nalidixic acid, nitrofurantoin, isoniazid, dapsone, and furazolidone). Henna has been known to cause hemolytic crisis in G6PD-deficient infants. Rasburicase is also contraindicated in G6PD deficiency. High dose intravenous vitamin C has also been known to cause haemolysis in G6PD deficiency carriers; therefore, G6PD deficiency testing is routine before infusion of doses of 25 g or more.

Genetics
Two variants (G6PD A− and G6PD Mediterranean) are the most common in human populations. G6PD A− has an occurrence of 10% of Africans and African-Americans while G6PD Mediterranean is prevalent in the Middle East. The known distribution of the mutated allele is largely limited to people of Mediterranean origins (Spaniards, Italians, Greeks, Armenians, Sephardi Jews and other Semitic peoples). Both variants are believed to stem from a strongly protective effect against Plasmodium falciparum and Plasmodium vivax malaria. It is particularly frequent in the Kurdish Jewish population, wherein approximately 1 in 2 males have the condition and the same rate of females are carriers. It is also common in African American, Saudi Arabian, Sardinian males, some African populations, and Asian groups.

All mutations that cause G6PD deficiency are found on the long arm of the X chromosome, on band Xq28. The G6PD gene spans some 18.5 kilobases. The following variants and mutations are well-known and described:

Pathophysiology

Glucose-6-phosphate dehydrogenase (G6PD) is an enzyme in the pentose phosphate pathway (see image, also known as the HMP shunt pathway). G6PD converts glucose-6-phosphate into 6-phosphoglucono-δ-lactone and is the rate-limiting enzyme of this metabolic pathway that supplies reducing energy to cells by maintaining the level of the reduced form of the co-enzyme nicotinamide adenine dinucleotide phosphate (NADPH). The NADPH maintains the supply of reduced glutathione in the cells that is used to mop up free radicals that cause oxidative damage. The pathway also stimulates catalase, an antioxidant enzyme.

The G6PD / NADPH pathway is the only source of reduced glutathione in red blood cells (erythrocytes). The role of red cells as oxygen carriers puts them at substantial risk of damage from oxidizing free radicals except for the protective effect of G6PD/NADPH/glutathione.

People with G6PD deficiency are therefore at risk of hemolytic anemia in states of oxidative stress. Oxidative stress can result from infection and from chemical exposure to medication and certain foods. Broad beans, e.g., fava beans, contain high levels of vicine, divicine, convicine and isouramil, all of which create oxidants.

When all remaining reduced glutathione is consumed, enzymes and other proteins (including hemoglobin) are subsequently damaged by the oxidants, leading to cross-bonding and protein deposition in the red cell membranes. Damaged red cells are phagocytosed and sequestered (taken out of circulation) in the spleen. The hemoglobin is metabolized to bilirubin (causing jaundice at high concentrations). The red cells rarely disintegrate in the circulation, so hemoglobin is rarely excreted directly by the kidney, but this can occur in severe cases, causing acute kidney injury.

Deficiency of G6PD in the alternative pathway causes the buildup of glucose and thus there is an increase of advanced glycation endproducts (AGE). The deficiency also reduces the amount of NADPH, which is required for the formation of nitric oxide (NO). The high prevalence of diabetes mellitus type 2 and hypertension in Afro-Caribbeans in the West could be directly related to the incidence of G6PD deficiency in those populations.

Although female carriers can have a mild form of G6PD deficiency (dependent on the degree of inactivation of the unaffected X chromosome – see lyonization), homozygous females have been described; in these females there is co-incidence of a rare immune disorder termed chronic granulomatous disease (CGD).

Diagnosis
The diagnosis is generally suspected when patients from certain ethnic groups (see epidemiology) develop anemia, jaundice and symptoms of hemolysis after challenges from any of the above causes, especially when there is a positive family history.

Generally, tests will include:
 Complete blood count and reticulocyte count; in active G6PD deficiency, Heinz bodies can be seen in red blood cells on a blood film;
 Liver enzymes (to exclude other causes of jaundice);
 Lactate dehydrogenase (elevated in hemolysis and a marker of hemolytic severity)
 Haptoglobin (decreased in hemolysis);
 A "direct antiglobulin test" (Coombs' test) – this should be negative, as hemolysis in G6PD is not immune-mediated;

When there are sufficient grounds to suspect G6PD, a direct test for G6PD is the "Beutler fluorescent spot test", which has largely replaced an older test (the Motulsky dye-decolouration test). Other possibilities are direct DNA testing and/or sequencing of the G6PD gene.

The Beutler fluorescent spot test is a rapid and inexpensive test that visually identifies NADPH produced by G6PD under ultraviolet light. When the blood spot does not fluoresce, the test is positive; it can be falsely negative in patients who are actively hemolysing. It can therefore only be done 2–3 weeks after a hemolytic episode.

When a macrophage in the spleen identifies a RBC with a Heinz body, it removes the precipitate and a small piece of the membrane, leading to characteristic "bite cells". However, if a large number of Heinz bodies are produced, as in the case of G6PD deficiency, some Heinz bodies will nonetheless be visible when viewing RBCs that have been stained with crystal violet. This easy and inexpensive test can lead to an initial presumption of G6PD deficiency, which can be confirmed with the other tests.

Testing during and for many weeks after a haemolytic episode will lead to false negative results as the G6PD deficient RBC will have been excreted and the young RBC (reticulocytes)will not yet be G6PD deficient. False negative results will also be likely following any blood transfusions.  For this reason, many hospitals wait for 3 months after a haemolytic episode before testing for G6PD deficiency.  Females should have their G6PD activity measured by quantitative assay to avoid being misclassified by screening tests.

Classification
The World Health Organization classifies G6PD genetic variants into five classes, the first three of which are deficiency states.
 Class I: Severe deficiency (<10% activity) with chronic (nonspherocytic) hemolytic anemia
 Class II: Severe deficiency (<10% activity), with intermittent hemolysis
 Class III: Moderate deficiency (10-60% activity), hemolysis with stressors only
 Class IV: Non-deficient variant, no clinical sequelae
 Class V: Increased enzyme activity, no clinical sequelae

Differential diagnosis
6-phosphogluconate dehydrogenase (6PGD) deficiency has similar symptoms and is often mistaken for G6PD deficiency, as the affected enzyme is within the same pathway, however these diseases are not linked and can be found within the same person.

Treatment
The most important measure is prevention – avoidance of the drugs and foods that cause hemolysis. Vaccination against some common pathogens (e.g. hepatitis A and hepatitis B) may prevent infection-induced attacks.

In the acute phase of hemolysis, blood transfusions might be necessary, or even dialysis in acute kidney failure. Blood transfusion is an important symptomatic measure, as the transfused red cells are generally not G6PD deficient and will live a normal lifespan in the recipient's circulation. Those affected should avoid drugs such as aspirin.

Some patients may benefit from removal of the spleen (splenectomy), as this is an important site of red cell destruction. Folic acid should be used in any disorder featuring a high red cell turnover. Although vitamin E and selenium have antioxidant properties, their use does not decrease the severity of G6PD deficiency.

Prognosis
G6PD-deficient individuals do not appear to acquire any illnesses more frequently than other people, and may have less risk than other people for acquiring ischemic heart disease and cerebrovascular disease.
However, a recent study revealed that G6PD deficiency increases the cardiovascular risk up to 70%. The risk conferred by G6PD deficiency is moderate compared with the impact of primary cardiovascular risk factors.
Besides, a published review hypothesized that G6PD deficiency  could reduce the antiplatelet efficacy of clopidogrel (clopidogrel resistance).

Epidemiology

G6PD deficiency is the second most common human enzyme defect after ALDH2 deficiency, being present in more than 400 million people worldwide. G6PD deficiency resulted in 4,100 deaths in 2013 and 3,400 deaths in 1990. The Mediterranean Basin is where favism is most common, especially among Mizrahi Jews, Sardinians, Cypriots, Greeks, Egyptians, and some African populations, including those who have these ancestries. Favism has also been documented outside of the Mediterranean basin, in other Middle Eastern and East Asian nations like Iraq, Iran, Bulgaria and China. Sardinia has the highest reported frequency of favism, with five instances per every 1,000 people.

A side effect of this disease is that it confers protection against malaria, in particular the form of malaria caused by Plasmodium falciparum, the most deadly form of malaria. A similar relationship exists between malaria and sickle-cell disease. One theory to explain this is that cells infected with the Plasmodium parasite are cleared more rapidly by the spleen. This phenomenon might give G6PD deficiency carriers an evolutionary advantage by increasing their fitness in malarial endemic environments.
In vitro studies have shown that the Plasmodium falciparum is very sensitive to oxidative damage. This is the basis for another theory, that is that the genetic defect confers resistance due to the fact that the G6PD-deficient host has a higher level of oxidative agents that, while generally tolerable by the host, are deadly to the parasite.

History
The modern understanding of the condition began with the analysis of patients who exhibited sensitivity to primaquine. The discovery of G6PD deficiency relied heavily upon the testing of prisoner volunteers at Illinois State Penitentiary, a type of study which today is considered unethical and cannot be performed. When some prisoners were given the drug primaquine, some developed hemolytic anemia but others did not. In spite of these results, the US military administered the drug widely during the Korean War to prevent the relapsing infection caused by Plasmodium vivax hypnozoites. Numerous cases of hemolytic anemia were observed in US soldiers of North African and Mediterranean descent.

After studying the mechanism through Cr51 testing, it was conclusively shown that the hemolytic effect of primaquine was due to an intrinsic defect of erythrocytes.

Society and culture
In both legend and mythology, favism has been known since antiquity. The priests of various Greco-Roman era cults were forbidden to eat or even mention beans, and Pythagoras had a strict rule that to join the society of the Pythagoreans one had to swear off beans. This ban was supposedly because beans resembled male genitalia, but it is possible that this was because of a belief that beans and humans were created from the same material.

References

External links 

 Family Practice Notebook/G6PD Deficiency (Favism)

Hereditary hemolytic anemias
Inborn errors of carbohydrate metabolism
Wikipedia medicine articles ready to translate